Cotswold is a small community located in the Town of Minto, in the northern part of Wellington County in southern Ontario, Canada. Cotswold was originally a separate community, but was amalgamated with other communities to create the Town of Minto.

History 
The name Cotswold is English, associated with a range of hills in the Midlands renowned for sheep grazing. The name does not reflect the backgrounds of the early settlers in the district, most of whom where Scottish and Irish; legend says that a settler imported sheep from Cotswold hills and borrowed the name for the post office. The early settlement did have several stores, including a blacksmith shop, cobbler, cheese Factory, gristmill, log schoolhouse, and sawmill, one of which also functioned as the post office..

The Cotswold Cheese factory (Minto and Arthur Cheese and Butter Manufacturing Company Limited) opened in 1881 and was successful in its 30  years of business, but was still only a marginal operation. Records show a change in ownership of various businesses (possibly due to low profits). The community declined as the roads to Palmerston and Harriston improved. The post office was the last holdout; it closed in 1914. After 50 years of settlement, most of Cotswold's pioneers were gone.

List of some Cotswold settlers and pioneers 

Wellington Adams
George Calder
John Campbell
Richard Conquest
John Darroch
John Greenwood
Charles, Thomas, and William Hughes
Elizabeth and Micheal Lawless
Peter Mckenzie
John Prain
George Reid
James Robertson
Wellington Wilson

Today 
The last remaining building was the Cotswold United Church, which was torn down circa 2010.  The community has been amalgamated with: Clifford, Cotswold, Drew, Fultons, Glenlee, Harriston, and Palmerston to form the Town of Minto.

References

External links 
 
 
 
 

Communities in Wellington County, Ontario